Palaina macgillivrayi, also known as Macgillivray's staircase snail, is a species of staircase snail that is endemic to Australia's Lord Howe Island in the Tasman Sea.

Description
The pupiform shell of adult snails is 5.2–6.3 mm in height, with a diameter of 2.9–3.1 mm. It is golden-brown in colour, darker on the final whorl and with a white peripheral band, with widely spaced ribs. The circular aperture has a strongly reflected lip. The animal has a white body with dark grey cephalic tentacles and black eyes.

Habitat
The snail is widespread and common across the island.

References

 
macgillivrayi
Gastropods of Lord Howe Island
Taxa named by Ludwig Karl Georg Pfeiffer
Gastropods described in 1855